2010 was the 22nd season of the Copa Simon Bolivar as a Second Division Tournament. In the previous season, Guabira was promoted after Ciclón had points deducted by the Bolivian Football Federation. After that the Ciclon manager was sacked for making that kind of error in a semi-professional match. The tournament started on the 6 August 2010. Most of the matches in Group C were broadcast on TV

Champions and runner-up from Primera A

Group stage

Group A

Group B

Group C

Second stage

Team No. 1 played the second leg at home. The stage began on October 16 and ended on October 25.

First Leg

Second Leg

Semifinals
 Note that Nacional Potosi qualified as the best loser. Team No. 1 played the second leg at home.

First Leg

Second Leg

Final

References

2010 in Bolivian football leagues
Copa Simón Bolívar seasons